Antônio Diogo da Silva Parreiras (20 January 1860, Niterói – 17 October 1937, Niterói) was a Brazilian painter, designer and illustrator.

Biography

He was one of nine children and his father was a goldsmith. In 1882, he enrolled at the Academia Imperial de Belas Artes in Rio de Janeiro, but left two years later to attend the free painting classes being offered by the German immigrant artist Georg Grimm. In 1885, when Grimm left to work in the countryside, Parreiras became an autodidact. A year later, one of his works was purchased by Emperor Pedro II.

This allowed him to resume his formal studies and travel to Europe in 1888, entering the Accademia di Belle Arti di Venezia where his teacher was Filippo Carcano. Upon his return to Brazil two years later, he participated in the "". Later that same year, he became a Professor of landscape painting at the Escola Nacional de Belas Artes (ENBA) and, following the example set by Grimm, introduced his students to plein-air painting. Following disagreements with ENBA over changes in the curriculum, he set up his own school called the " Escola do Ar Livre".

He was soon doing much of his work in the forests outside Teresópolis. He also received numerous commissions to paint historical scenes and, after 1899, did decorations for the government in public buildings, such as the "Allegory of Apollo and the Goddesses of the Hours", which he created for the Palácio da Liberdade in Belo Horizonte. His female nudes are also considered to be especially well done. From 1906 to 1919, he maintained a second studio in Paris and exhibited at the Salon. He was also named a delegate of the Société Nationale des Beaux-Arts in 1911.

The following year, he published his autobiography and was inducted into the "". In 1933, he participated in his last exhibitions; the "Jubileu Artístico" in São Paulo and Niteroi.

Other selected paintings

See also 

 Belém Museum of Art

References

Further reading
 História de um pintor (autobiography), edited by Athayde Parreiras. Diário oficial (reprint, 1943)
 , Antônio Parreiras (1860-1937), pintor de paisagem: gênero e história, Edições Pinakotheke (1981)
 Valéria Salgueiro, Antônio Parreiras: notas e críticas, discursos e contos : coletânea de textos de um pintor paisagista, Editora da Universidade Federal Fluminense (2000)  Notes from the book @ DezenoveVinte 
 Maria de Lourdes Eleutério, "Antônio Parreiras", Volume 21 of Coleção Folha Grandes pintores brasileiros, Folha de S.Paulo (2013)

External links

 Museu Antônio Parreiras homepage.

1860 births
1937 deaths
Landscape artists
19th-century Brazilian painters
19th-century Brazilian male artists
20th-century Brazilian painters
20th-century Brazilian male artists